Lee Quincy Calhoun (February 23, 1933 – June 21, 1989) was an American athlete, a double winner of 110 m hurdles at the Olympic Games.

Biography
Born in Laurel, Mississippi, Lee Calhoun, representing North Carolina Central University, won the NCAA 120 yd hurdles in 1956 and 1957. He also won the AAU championships in 110 m hurdles in 1956 and 1959 and in 120 yd hurdles in 1957.

At the 1956 Summer Olympics Calhoun surprisingly improved his personal best in 110 m by almost a full second in a final. He ran 13.5 to win the gold medal, edging teammate Jack Davis with a lunge that just got his shoulder across the line in front. He had learned the maneuver from Davis.

Calhoun was suspended in 1958 for receiving gifts on Bride and Groom, a television game show, and seemed to be past his prime for the 1960 Summer Olympics. But shortly before the Rome Olympics, he tied the world record of 13.2 and went to the Olympic Games as a main favourite. In the final, he won in 13.98, beating teammate Willie May by 0.01 seconds.

After retiring from competition, he became a college track coach, first at Grambling State University, then at Yale, and finally at Western Illinois University. He was an assistant Olympic coach at the 1976 Summer Olympics.

He was elected to the United States National Track and Field Hall of Fame in 1974.

Lee Calhoun died in Erie, Pennsylvania, aged 56.

References

External links
 
 
 
 
 

1933 births
1989 deaths
American male hurdlers
College men's track and field athletes in the United States
North Carolina Central University alumni
Athletes (track and field) at the 1956 Summer Olympics
Athletes (track and field) at the 1959 Pan American Games
Athletes (track and field) at the 1960 Summer Olympics
People from Laurel, Mississippi
Track and field athletes from Mississippi
Medalists at the 1960 Summer Olympics
Medalists at the 1956 Summer Olympics
Olympic gold medalists for the United States in track and field
Pan American Games silver medalists for the United States
Pan American Games medalists in athletics (track and field)
Medalists at the 1959 Pan American Games